Carlena Williams (February 25, 1942 – November 13, 2013) was an American vocalist. Early in her career, she recorded under her name, Flora Williams, as an Ikette in the Ike & Tina Turner Revue. In the 1960s she released a few singles as Carlena Weaver. She later toured with rock group Pink Floyd as a backing vocalist. Williams sang with various artists, including The Carpenters, Bonnie Raitt, Van Morrison, Etta James, David Gilmour, and Humble Pie. Williams was a member of Sunshine, Donna Summer's backing vocal group in the 1970s.

Life and career 
Born on February 25, 1942, Flora Williams spent her childhood in North Carolina. She began singing in church at the age of 13, and during high school she sang in the vocal group called the Delvettes. After graduation she relocated to Buffalo, New York. In Buffalo, she sang at the nightclub the Shalimar Club where she opened for headliners.

Williams sang in the Corinthian Gospel Singers with Venetta Fields who became an Ikette in the Ike & Tina Turner Revue. Williams joined the revue in the early 1960s. She released a few singles written and produced by Ike Turner on his labels Teena Records and Sonja Records.

After her tenure as an Ikette, she returned to Buffalo, and later toured with the Avengers which included two other vocalists Hank Mullen and Moe Jones. She released a single under the name Carlena Weaver on the homegrown Audel label in 1967. Some time after, she released another single on Mo Do Records, owned by William Nunn (father of R&B singer Bobby Nunn).

Williams paired up with Venetta Fields as The Blackberries, which had been the name of a group Fields formed with singer Clydie King. In 1973, they were working with Humble Pie when Pink Floyd guitarist David Gilmour convinced them to sing with Pink Floyd. Fields sang on their Dark Side of the Moon Tour and Williams was on their 1974 French Summer Tour. Williams and Fields to provide vocals for Pink Floyd's album Wish You Were Here (1975).

In 1975, Williams released a solo single on Venice Records. Through the latter part of the decade she sang backing vocals for various artists, including Roy Buchanan, The Carpenters, Bonnie Raitt, Van Morrison, and Donna Summer. She also contributed vocals to David Gilmour's first solo album David Gilmour (1978). In 1984, she recorded for Broadcast Records located in North Carolina.

Williams released her self-published autobiography, A Promise Is A Promise, in 2006. She died on November 13, 2013.

Discography

Singles

Flora Williams 

 1963: "Love Me Or Leave Me" / "I'll Wait For You" (Teena 1704)
 1963: "Blue With A Broken Heart "/ "Mind In A Whirl" (Sonja 2003)

Carlena Weaver 

 1967: "Jealousy" / "Heart Break" (Audel 363)
 1968/1969: "Smile A Rainbow" / "Happy Mood" (Mo Do 105)

Carlena Williams 

 1975: "Hey Radio" / "I Won't Be Completely Happy" (Venice 001)
 1984: "(When I'm) Touching You" / "When You're Near" (Broadcast 10705)

Album appearances 

 1992: The Ikettes – Fine Fine Fine (Kent Records)
 2007: The Ikettes – Can't Sit Down... 'Cos It Feels So Good: The Complete Modern Recordings (Kent Soul)
 2007: The Ikettes – Soul The Hits (Modern Records)
 2012: A Woman Needs A Man To Love: Lady Soul 1965-1991 (P-Vine Records)

Backing vocal credits 

 1974: Etta James – Come A Little Closer
 1974: Humble Pie – Thunderbox
 1974: Roy Buchanan – In The Beginning
1974: Richard "Dimples" Fields – Spoiled Rotten!
1974: Love – Reel-To-Real
1975: Country Joe McDonald – Paradise With An Ocean View
 1975: Pink Floyd – Wish You Were Here
1975: The Righteous Brothers – The Sons Of Mrs. Righteous
1976: Steve Marriott – Marriott
1976: Dianne Brooks – Back Stairs Of My Life
1977: Donna Summer – Once Upon A Time
1977: Bonnie Raitt – Sweet Forgiveness
1977: Van Morrison – A Period Of Transition
1977: The Carpenters – Passage
1978: David Gilmour – David Gilmour
1978: Paul Jabara – Keeping Time
1978: Donna Summer – Live And More
1979: Brooklyn Dreams – Sleepless Nights

Books 

 2006: A Promise Is A Promise

References

External links 

 Carlena Williams Credits on AllMusic
 

1942 births
2013 deaths
African-American women singers
Singers from North Carolina
Musicians from Buffalo, New York
Ike & Tina Turner members
Sonja Records artists
American soul singers
American rhythm and blues singers
The Blackberries members